"Loco" is the lead single from Jowell & Randy's album El Momento released on February 27, 2010. A remix features reggaeton duo Wisin & Yandel, was released later on June 15, 2010.

Live performances
The remix version was performed on the 2010 Premios Juventud on July 15, before that, Wisin & Yandel performed their single "Irresistible", including a choreography by the dancers of Step Up 3D dancing behind them.

Music video
A music video for both versions (album version & remix) was filmed since February 23, 2010 in San Juan, Puerto Rico directed by Music video director Ulysses Terrero.

The video for the album version was premiered on March 30, 2010, while the remix version with Wisin & Yandel was premiered on July 8, 2010.

Charts

Year-end charts

References

External links 

2010 singles
Jowell & Randy songs
Wisin & Yandel songs
2010 songs